Junior Thabo Khanye (born 18 June 1985 in Daveyton, Gauteng) is a South African association football player who plays for Malanti Chiefs in the Swazi Premier League.

Career

Club career
Khanye formerly played for Kaizer Chiefs and Platinum Stars. He signed for Maritzburg United in August 2008.

International career
Khanye has competed at the Toulon tournament with the South Africa Under-20 side. He played at the 2005 COSAFA Cup, and has also earned one cap for the South African national side.

References

1985 births
Living people
South African soccer players
South Africa international soccer players
Kaizer Chiefs F.C. players
Maritzburg United F.C. players
Association football wingers